A hemi-icosahedron is an abstract regular polyhedron, containing half the faces of a regular icosahedron. It can be realized as a projective polyhedron (a tessellation of the real projective plane by 10 triangles), which can be visualized by constructing the projective plane as a hemisphere where opposite points along the boundary are connected and dividing the hemisphere into three equal parts.

Geometry

It has 10 triangular faces, 15 edges, and 6 vertices. 

It is also related to the nonconvex uniform polyhedron, the tetrahemihexahedron, which could be topologically identical to the hemi-icosahedron if each of the 3 square faces were divided into two triangles.

Graphs
It can be represented symmetrically on faces, and vertices as Schlegel diagrams:

The complete graph K6 
It has the same vertices and edges as the 5-dimensional 5-simplex which has a complete graph of edges, but only contains half of the (20) faces.

With this
embedding, the dual graph is the Petersen graph --- see hemi-dodecahedron.

See also 
11-cell - an abstract regular 4-polytope constructed from 11 hemi-icosahedra.
hemi-dodecahedron
hemi-cube
hemi-octahedron

References

External links
 The hemi-icosahedron

Projective polyhedra